This is a List of FIA Formula 2 Championship drivers, that is, a list of drivers who have made at least one race start in the FIA Formula 2 Championship, which was established in 2017. 

This list is accurate up to and including the Jeddah Formula 2 round of the 2023 FIA Formula 2 Championship.

By name

Drivers in bold will compete in the 2023 FIA Formula 2 Championship.

By racing license

Footnotes

References

FIA Formula 2 Championship seasons
 
FIA Formula 2 Championship drivers